Fedor Alexander Gustav von Rauch (8 August 1822 in Berlin - 15 January 1892) was a cavalry officer in the Prussian Army and son of the Prussian Minister of War and general of the infantry Gustav von Rauch.

Biography 
Fedor von Rauch was born in Berlin on 8 August 1822. He became 'Oberstallmeister' (chief equerry) on the privy councils of the German Emperors William I, Frederick III and Wilhelm II. He also took a major part in horse breeding and racing, becoming vice-president of the Union Club in Berlin (modelled on the British Jockey Club). In 1856 Fedor von Rauch married Elisabeth Countess von Waldersee (1837–1914), lady-in-waiting to Grand Duchess consort Marie von Mecklenburg-Strelitz.

External links 

Prussian Army personnel
1822 births
1892 deaths
Fedor
Military personnel from Berlin